Pretty in Black is the second studio album by The Raveonettes. The album includes guest appearances by Maureen Tucker (The Velvet Underground), Ronnie Spector (The Ronettes), and Martin Rev (Suicide).

Reception

The album received generally positive reviews upon its release. At Metacritic, which assigns a normalised rating out of 100 to reviews from mainstream critics, the album received an average score of 74, based on 26 reviews, which indicates "Generally favorable reviews".

Track listing

References

2005 albums
The Raveonettes albums
Albums produced by Richard Gottehrer
Columbia Records albums